Filipe Joaquim Melo Silva (born 3 November 1989), known as Melo, is a Portuguese footballer who plays for União de Lamas as a defensive midfielder.

Club career

Portugal
Born in Santa Maria de Lamas, Aveiro District, Melo kicked off his career with local C.F. União de Lamas after joining their youth system in 1998. He continued competing in the lower leagues until the age of 21, successively representing A.A. Avanca and S.C. Espinho, both while on loan from S.C. Beira-Mar, who also ceded him to F.C. Arouca where he made his professional debut in 2011–12, scoring his only goal of the season in a 1−0 Segunda Liga win against C.D. Santa Clara on 22 January 2012.

In the summer of 2012, free agent Melo signed a one-year contract with Associação Naval 1º de Maio also in the second level. For 2013–14, he joined fellow league side Moreirense F.C. alongside Diogo Cunha and Jorge Pires. On 27 November 2013, in a 0−2 loss at C.D. Aves, he was sent off in the 71st minute for fouling Pedro Pereira, being again redcarded in a goalless draw against S.C. Covilhã the following month. His first goal of the campaign came in a 7−1 away victory over C.D. Trofense on 16 January 2014, and he would score one more in 35 games in his first year as the team returned to the Primeira Liga after a one-year absence; he was also awarded captaincy during this timeframe.

Sheffield Wednesday
Melo signed a three-year deal with English Championship club Sheffield Wednesday on 2 February 2015 for an undisclosed fee, joining compatriots Carlos Carvalhal (coach), Lucas João, Marco Matias and José Semedo. He made his debut eight days later, in a 1−2 away defeat against Ipswich Town where he came on as a 58th-minute substitute for Sam Hutchinson.

In November 2015, it was announced that Melo had been ruled out for the remainder of the season after undergoing knee surgery.

Return home
Melo went back to Portugal's top flight on 18 January 2017, joining F.C. Paços de Ferreira on loan for the rest of the campaign. He left Wednesday on 10 July, when he moved to G.D. Chaves on a three-year deal.

Having totalled just 19 appearances in two seasons for the Trás-os-Montes club, Melo terminated his contract by mutual consent with a year left in July 2019, after their relegation. Days later, he signed for two years with S.C. Farense of the second tier.

Career statistics

References

External links

1989 births
Living people
Sportspeople from Santa Maria da Feira
Portuguese footballers
Association football midfielders
Primeira Liga players
Liga Portugal 2 players
Segunda Divisão players
C.F. União de Lamas players
S.C. Beira-Mar players
S.C. Espinho players
F.C. Arouca players
Associação Naval 1º de Maio players
Moreirense F.C. players
F.C. Paços de Ferreira players
G.D. Chaves players
S.C. Farense players
U.D. Vilafranquense players
English Football League players
Sheffield Wednesday F.C. players
Portuguese expatriate footballers
Expatriate footballers in England
Portuguese expatriate sportspeople in England